Veronica Vernocchi (born ) is an Italian female Muay Thai fighter and Kickboxer artist, based in Genoa, Italy.

Championships and awards

Kickboxing
 2013 - WKA Kickboxing World Champion
 2013 - Championships Oktagon
 2012 - Championships Oktagon
 2011 - FIKBMS Italian Championships | 1st Series Low Kick

Muay Thai
 2015 - ISKA Muay Thai Europe Champion
 2013 - ISKA Muay Thai World Champion
 2012 - FIKBMS Italian Championships | 1st Series Muay Thai

Kickboxing record

|-  style="background:#fbb;"
| 2016-04-16 || Loss||align=left| Denise Kielholtz   || Bellator Kickboxing 1 || Turin, Italy || Decision (split)|| 3 || 3:00 || 15–1
|-  style="background:#cfc;"
| 2009-11-07 || Win ||align=left| Valentina Carraro  || Golden League VI  || Genoa, Italy || Points||  || ||
|-  style="background:#fbb;"
| 2009-05-30 || Loss||align=left| Anne-Laure Gaudry  || International France vs Italy Gala  || Genoa, Italy || Points||  || ||
|-  style="background:#cfc;"
| 2009-04-10 || Win ||align=left| Valentina Carraro  || Night Fighters  || Genoa, Italy || Points||  || ||
|-
| colspan=9 | Legend:

References

External links
 Veronica Vernocchi at Awakening Fighters

1978 births
Sportspeople from Genoa
Italian female kickboxers
Living people
Italian Muay Thai practitioners
Female Muay Thai practitioners
Flyweight kickboxers